Mi adorable maldición ("My adorable curse") is a Mexican telenovela produced by Ignacio Sada. It is an adaptation of the Colombian story written by Julio Jiménez titled Lola Calamidades, which most recent version, Bella Calamidades, starred Danna García. The series is adapted for television by Gabriela Ortigoza and directed by Sandra Schiffner, Eduardo Said and Martha Montufar. It premiered on January 23, 2017, and ended on July 9, 2017. A total of 120 episodes were initially confirmed. but the show ran for 121 episodes.

The series is starring Renata Notni as Aurora Sánchez, Pablo Lyle as Rodrigo Villavicencio, Laura Carmine as Mónica Solana, Roberto Blandón as Severo Trujillo, José Carlos Ruiz as Ponciano Juárez, Patricia Navidad as Apolonia Ortega and Maya Mishalska as Elsa Solana.

Plot 
Mi adorable maldición tells the story of Aurora, a beautiful teenager who, when born, was stigmatized by Macrina the midwife, as a creature born of evil, a carrier of misfortune, pain, and death. This is because Macrina discovers in Aurora a lunar in the form of skull on her navel, and the mother of Aurora dies just after the delivery. Anselmo, father of Aurora, fails to overcome the loss of his wife, Carmen. He dumps all his love in Aurora and insists on protecting and keeping her away from the people of the town who point her as an evil creature. Aurora's curious spirit takes her one day to disobey her father and approach the village. At first, Aurora does not understand why her father has denied meeting these people who are so kind, but everything changes the moment she meets Macrina, who recognizes Aurora and the supposed curse that weighs on her. The people, when identifying her, attack Aurora. Rodrigo, a boy of 15 years, intervenes to defend her. From that moment Aurora and Rodrigo initiate a beautiful friendship that will eventually become the first and only love of both.

Production 
Filming began on December 12, 2016, at Televisa San Ángel. The telenovela was formerly known as "La bella Lola",  but was later renamed "Mi adorable maldición".
On February 20, 2017, it was announced Conan O'Brien will have a guest appearance on the show.

Cast

Main cast 
 Renata Notni as Aurora Sánchez
 Pablo Lyle as Rodrigo Villavicencio
 Laura Carmine as Monica
 Roberto Blandón as Severo Trujillo
 José Carlos Ruiz as Ponciano Juárez
 Patricia Navidad as Apolonia Ortega 
 Maya Mishalska as Elsa Solana
 Cecilia Gabriela as Corinne
 Socorro Bonilla as Macrina Romero
 Paty Díaz as  Brígida Sánchez
 Erik Díaz as Rafael Galicia
 Alejandro Ávila as Camilo Espinosa
 Juan Ángel Esparza as Jerónimo Ríos
 Alejandro Ruíz as Comandante Onesimo Quiñones
 Bárbara Gómez as Altagracia
 Iliana de la Garza as Maximina
 Catalina López as Xócthil Romero
 Aldo Guerra as Luis Delgado
 Gema Garoa as Pilar Alarcón
 Ilse Ikeda as Bonifacia Mujica
 Christian Andrei as Wenceslao
 Fabiola Andere as Epifania
 Santiago Hernández as Gonzalo Galicia
 Ana Tena as Young Aurora
 Mikel as Young Rodrigo
 Ricardo Zertuche as Tobías Ávila Juárez
 Ignacio Guadalupe as Anselmo Sánchez 
 Héctor Cruz Lara as Abundio Ibarra
 Virginia Marín as Gloria Júarez
 Carlos Athié as Ernesto
 Ernesto Gómez Cruz as Padre Basilio

Recurring 
 Eva Cedeño as Inés Bustos
 Arturo Vásquez as Dionisio Ávila
 Raúl Coronado as Lucas Almada

Guest appearances 
 Conan O'Brien as Joseph Robinson the Cheese Merchant

Awards and nominations

References 

2017 telenovelas
2017 Mexican television series debuts
Mexican telenovelas
Televisa telenovelas
2017 Mexican television series endings
Mexican television series based on Colombian television series
Spanish-language telenovelas